The Touws River is a river in the Western Cape province of South Africa. It is a tributary of the Groot River, part of the Gourits River basin. A notable resident of the town is Margaret Maritz (born 27 September 1906) who, as of 2022 and at the age of 116, was regarded as one of the oldest people in South Africa.

Name
The name "Touws" originates from a Khoi word for ash, which also referred to the local "Ash-bushes" (Salsola aphylla). It is uncertain whether the name originally referred to the bushes, or to the colour of the river (historically, the Touws river was occasionally known as the "Ash river").

It also gave its name to the town of Touws River, which lies on the upper reaches of this river.

Course
It sources are in the Matroosberg, Hex River Mountains, near the town of De Doorns.

Flowing in a southeastern direction, it flows past Touws River town, meeting the right bank of the Groot River after briefly turning southwards. Its tributaries include the Brand, Kalee, Brak, Slang and the Kruis; all are minor rivers.

The Touws is part of the Gouritz Water Management Area and falls within the Drainage system J.

Dams
 Verkeerdevlei Dam (capacity )

See also 
 List of rivers of South Africa
 List of drainage basins of South Africa
 Water Management Areas

References

External links
Bloutoring Farm, Touws River / Montagu area

Rivers of the Western Cape